The Nailloux Altarpiece (French: "Retable de Nailloux") is a retable-type altarpiece made of five alabaster panels carved in high relief. Dedicated to the Passion of Jesus Christ, it is conserved in a chapel of St Martin's Church in Nailloux, in the Haute-Garonne department in southwestern France.

The retable is a typical product of the Nottingham alabaster industry, carved during the second half of the 15th century in a Midlands workshop in England.  These were cheaper than alternative forms of sculpted altarpiece, and many were exported. The work was produced in a period of economic development for the region: the golden age of woad culture in Lauragais.

With a total length of 1.46 m (57 in), the altarpiece is made of four side panels of 43 × 25 cm (18 x 9 in) and a bigger central panel of 50 × 25 cm (19 x 9 in).

The Passion of Christ is the most common subject in medieval altarpieces because shows the sacrifice of Christ, commemorated in the Eucharist. The Nailloux altarpiece represents, from left to right: the Arrest, the Flagellation, the Crucifixion (main panel), the Entombment and the Resurrection of Christ.

The neighbouring church of Montgeard also houses four panels of a dismembered Nottingham alabaster altarpiece (probably dedicated to the Life of the Virgin). 

The Nailloux Altarpiece is classified "Monument historique" as an objet since 1914. After the renovation of the church, completed in 2011, the altarpiece was restored in 2013 following a subscription to the Fondation du Patrimoine.

See also 
Gothic sculpture
Nottingham alabaster

Bibliography 
Cheetham Francis, English medieval alabaster: with a catalogue of the collection in the Victoria and Albert Museum, Woodbridge, UK New York, Boydell Press in association with the Association for Cultural Exchange, 2005, 2nd édition.
Gorguet Pascale, Répertoire des albâtres anglais du XIVe au XVe siècle dans le Sud-Ouest: mémoire de maîtrise présenté sous la direction des professeurs Yves Bruand et Michèle Pradalier, Université Toulouse Le Mirail, 1984.

References

Sculptures depicting the Passion of Jesus
Gothic sculptures
Alabaster
English sculpture